Crumenaria is a genus of flowering plants belonging to the family Rhamnaceae.

Its native range is Central America to Argentina.

Species:

Crumenaria decumbens 
Crumenaria erecta 
Crumenaria glaziovii 
Crumenaria lilloi

References

Rhamnaceae
Rhamnaceae genera